Etobicoke—Rexdale was a provincial electoral district in Ontario, Canada. It was created prior to the 1987 provincial election and eliminated in 1996, when its territory was incorporated into the riding of Etobicoke North. Etobicoke—Rexdale riding was created from Etobicoke. It was in the former borough of Etobicoke.

Two Members of Provincial Parliament represented the riding during its 
history. The most notable was Ed Philip who served in Bob Rae's cabinet in a number of roles from 1990 to 1995.

Members of Provincial Parliament

Electoral results

References

Notes

Citations

Former provincial electoral districts of Ontario
Provincial electoral districts of Toronto
Etobicoke